In logic, a predicate is a symbol that represents a property or a relation. For instance, in the first-order formula , the symbol  is a predicate that applies to the individual constant .

In the semantics of logic, predicates are interpreted as relations. Since predicates are non-logical symbols, they can denote different relations depending on the interpretation given to them. While first-order logic only includes predicates that apply to individual constants, other logics may allow predicates that apply to other predicates.

Predicates in different systems 
A predicate is a statement or mathematical assertion that contains variables, sometimes referred to as predicate variables, and may be true or false depending on those variables’ value or values.
 In propositional logic, atomic formulas are sometimes regarded as zero-place predicates. In a sense, these are nullary (i.e. 0-arity) predicates.
 In first-order logic, a predicate forms an atomic formula when applied to an appropriate number of terms. 
 In set theory with the law of excluded middle, predicates are understood to be characteristic functions or set indicator functions (i.e., functions from a set element to a truth value). Set-builder notation makes use of predicates to define sets.
 In autoepistemic logic, which rejects the law of excluded middle, predicates may be true, false, or simply unknown. In particular, a given collection of facts may be insufficient to determine the truth or falsehood of a predicate.
 In fuzzy logic, the strict true/false valuation of the predicate is replaced by a quantity interpreted as the degree of truth.

See also
Classifying topos
 Free variables and bound variables
 Multigrade predicate
 Opaque predicate
 Predicate functor logic
 Predicate variable
 Truthbearer
 Well-formed formula

References

External links
Introduction to predicates

Predicate logic
Propositional calculus
Basic concepts in set theory
Fuzzy logic
Mathematical logic